Hefin Wyn David (born 1977) is a Welsh Labour politician and the Member of the Senedd (MS) for Caerphilly. He was elected in 2016 to replace Jeff Cuthbert, who became Gwent Police and Crime Commissioner. Despite the common surname, he is no relation to Wayne David, the Member of Parliament (MP) for the same constituency.

Early life 
He earned a BScEcon degree in Economics and Politics, and an MScEcon degree in European Policy, both from Cardiff University, followed by a PGCE from the University of Wales, Newport (now the University of South Wales) and a PhD from the University Of Gloucestershire. He was a senior lecturer at the University of Wales, Newport and later at Cardiff Metropolitan University.

Political career 
Until May 2017 he was a councillor for ward of St Cattwg on Caerphilly County Borough Council. During the 2012– 2017 term, he was chair of a number of committees including Policy and Resources Scrutiny.

David was elected to the Assembly seat for Caerphilly in 2016, securing 35.3% of the vote and a majority of 1,575 over second-placed Plaid Cymru.

References

1977 births
Living people
Wales MSs 2016–2021
Wales MSs 2021–2026
People from Caerphilly
Place of birth missing (living people)
People educated at Heolddu Comprehensive School
Welsh Labour members of the Senedd